Craig Smith (born 9 January 1985) is a New Zealand first-class cricketer who plays for Otago.

See also
 List of Otago representative cricketers

References

External links
 

1985 births
Living people
New Zealand cricketers
Otago cricketers
Cricketers from Oamaru